Just One Love is the 43rd studio album by the American country singer Willie Nelson, released in 1995. Ten of the songs are covers of pre-rock 'n' roll country and honky tonk.

Just One Love includes two duets with Kimmie Rhodes. "Eight More Miles to Louisville" is a cover of the Grandpa Jones song.

Critical reception

Entertainment Weekly wrote that the album finds Nelson "veering between simple elegance and somnambulism." The Washington Post deemed it "a superb, old-fashioned honky-tonk album."

Track listing
 "Just One Love" (Kimmie Rhodes) - 4:03
 "Each Night at Nine" (Floyd Tillman)- 2:21
 "This Cold Cold War with You" (Floyd Tillman)- 2:52
 "Better Left Forgotten" (Chip Young)- 3:05
 "It's a Sin" (Fred Rose, Zeb Turner) - 2:02
 "Four Walls" (George Campbell, Marvin Moore) - 4:12
 "Smoke! Smoke! Smoke! (That Cigarette)" (Merle Travis, Tex Williams) - 2:54
 "I Just Drove By" (Kimmie Rhodes) - 4:12
 "Cold, Cold Heart" (Hank Williams) - 3:10
 "Bonaparte's Retreat" (Pee Wee King, Redd Stewart)- 2:07
 "Alabam" (Lloyd "Cowboy" Copas) - 2:38
 "Eight More Miles to Louisville" (Louis "Grandpa" Jones)- 2:16

Personnel
 Willie Nelson - Guitar, vocals
 Ray Edenton - Guitar
 Buddy Emmons - Bass, steel guitar
 Freddy Joe Fletcher - Drums
 Buddy Harman - Drums
 Grandpa Jones - Banjo, vocals
 Lisa Jones - Dulcime
 Mike Leech - Bass
 Grady Martin - Guitar, keyboards
 Bobbie Nelson - Keyboards
 Jody Payne - Guitar
 Kimmie Rhodes - Vocals
 Pete Wade - Guitar
 Chip Young - Guitar

References

1995 albums
Willie Nelson albums